Asahel Stearns (June 17, 1774 – February 5, 1839) was a U.S. Representative from Massachusetts.

Born in Lunenburg in the Province of Massachusetts Bay, Stearns graduated from Harvard University in 1797. He studied law, was admitted to the bar and commenced the practice of law in Chelmsford, Massachusetts. He served as member of the Massachusetts Senate in 1813, the same year he was elected a Fellow of the American Academy of Arts and Sciences. He moved to Charlestown, Massachusetts, in 1815.

Stearns was elected as a Federalist to the Fourteenth Congress (March 4, 1815 – March 3, 1817). He served in the Massachusetts House of Representatives in 1817. He was professor of law at Harvard University from 1817 to 1829.  He again served as a member of the Massachusetts Senate in 1830 and 1831. He died in Cambridge, Massachusetts, February 5, 1839. He was interred in Mount Auburn Cemetery.

References

External links

 
 
 

1774 births
1839 deaths
Fellows of the American Academy of Arts and Sciences
Harvard University alumni
People from Lunenburg, Massachusetts
Members of the Massachusetts House of Representatives
Massachusetts state senators
Harvard Law School faculty
Burials at Mount Auburn Cemetery
Federalist Party members of the United States House of Representatives from Massachusetts